Chandra Sekhar Sahu (born 7 July 1950) is a member of the 14th Lok Sabha of India. He represents the Brahmapur constituency of Odisha and was a member of the Indian National Congress now in Biju Janata Dal.

He was Minister of State in the Ministry of Rural Development

In the 15th Lok Sabha Election of India he lost to Odia mega star Siddhanta Mahapatra

External links
 Members of Fourteenth Lok Sabha - Parliament of India website

1950 births
Living people
India MPs 2004–2009
India MPs 2019–present
People from Odisha
Indian National Congress politicians from Odisha
Union ministers of state of India
Lok Sabha members from Odisha
People from Brahmapur
Biju Janata Dal politicians